Never Have to Be Alone is a song by American gospel singer CeCe Winans, released in 2017. The song earned the singer a Grammy Award for Best Gospel Performance/Song. The song is from the artist's Let Them Fall in Love album.

References

2017 songs